Eois vinosata is a moth in the  family Geometridae. It is found in Peru and Ecuador.

The wingspan is about 22 mm. The forewings are bright yellow, the basal area crossed by four or five sinuous vinous lines, the outermost containing a large vinous black cell-spot. The hindwings have a yellow base, a spot on the inner margin and a vinous cell-spot.

References

Moths described in 1907
Taxa named by William Warren (entomologist)
Eois
Moths of South America